Mudhar H.C (Arabic: نادي مضر السعودي لكرة اليد, English: Mudhar Handball Club) is a Saudi Arabian handball team based in Al-Qudaih, that plays in Prince Faisal bin Fahad Saudi Handball League.

See also 
List of handball clubs in Saudi Arabia

References

External links 
 Official Website (Arabic)

Saudi Arabian handball clubs
Qatif